George Horlin-Smith (born 22 December 1992) is a former Australian rules footballer who played for the Gold Coast Football Club and the Geelong Football Club in the Australian Football League (AFL).

Early life
Horlin-Smith went to Pembroke School in Adelaide, South Australia. Horlin-Smith was a promising cricketer, having co-captained the Australian under-16 cricket team to the West Indies in 2008, but he decided to pursue a career in football. Along with playing at Pembroke, Horlin-Smith would play his junior football at the Payneham Norwood Union Football Club and the Sturt Football Club. He has played for Geelong in the NAB Cup. He was taken by Geelong at number 37 in the 2010 AFL national draft.

AFL career
After suffering a shoulder injury in the lead-up to the 2011 season, Horlin-Smith was unable to break into Geelong's strong senior team, but he did manage nine games for Geelong's VFL side.

Horlin-Smith's development continued in 2012, playing three games with Geelong's AFL side. His 2012 season in Geelong's VFL side garnered a premiership medal with the Cats, and the Norm Goss Memorial Medal for best player afield in the Grand Final. He finished the regular season as Geelong's highest vote getter in the J.J. Liston medal, coming 5th overall.

Horlin-Smith was awarded the Round 4 nomination for the 2013 AFL Rising Star.

Personal life
Horlin-Smith obtained a Master of Business Administration from Deakin University in 2019.

Statistics
 Statistics are correct to end of 2018

|- style="background:#eaeaea;"
! scope="row" style="text-align:center" | 2012
| style="text-align:center" | 
| 33 || 3 || 2 || 1 || 20 || 17 || 37 || 12 || 3 || 0.7 || 0.3 || 6.7 || 5.7 || 12.3 || 4.0 || 1.0
|-
! scope="row" style="text-align:center" | 2013
| style="text-align:center" | 
| 33 || 8 || 3 || 2 || 51 || 67 || 118 || 23 || 18 || 0.4 || 0.3 || 6.4 || 8.4 || 14.8 || 2.9 || 2.3
|- style="background:#eaeaea;"
! scope="row" style="text-align:center" | 2014
| style="text-align:center" | 
| 33 || 21 || 13 || 12 || 167 || 174 || 341 || 56 || 58 || 0.6 || 0.6 || 8.0 || 8.3 || 16.2 || 2.7 || 2.8
|-
! scope="row" style="text-align:center" | 2015
| style="text-align:center" | 
| 33 || 7 || 2 || 1 || 29 || 70 || 99 || 15 || 21 || 0.3 || 0.1 || 4.1 || 10.0 || 14.1 || 2.1 || 3.0
|- style="background:#eaeaea;"
! scope="row" style="text-align:center" | 2016
| style="text-align:center" | 
| 33 || 1 || 0 || 0 || 5 || 4 || 9 || 1 || 2 || 0.0 || 0.0 || 5.0 || 4.0 || 9.0 || 1.0 || 2.0
|-
! scope="row" style="text-align:center" | 2017
| style="text-align:center" | 
| 33 || 7 || 4 || 3 || 65 || 68 || 133 || 13 || 30 || 0.6 || 0.4 || 9.3 || 9.7 || 19.0 || 1.9 || 4.3
|- style="background:#eaeaea;"
! scope="row" style="text-align:center" | 2018
| style="text-align:center" | 
| 33 || 4 || 3 || 0 || 34 || 31 || 65 || 7 || 15 || 0.8 || 0.0 || 8.5 || 7.8 || 16.3 || 1.8 || 3.8
|- class="sortbottom"
! colspan=3| Career
! 51
! 27
! 19
! 371
! 431
! 802
! 127
! 147
! 0.5
! 0.4
! 7.3
! 8.5
! 15.7
! 2.5
! 2.9
|}

References

External links

 

Geelong Football Club players
Living people
1992 births
Sturt Football Club players
Australian rules footballers from Adelaide
People educated at Pembroke School, Adelaide
Gold Coast Football Club players
Deakin University alumni